The 2010-11 Russian Women's Handball Super League was the 19th edition of the premier championship for women's handball in Russia. Ten teams took part in the competition, which took place from 4 September 2010 to 28 May 2011. The competition system was reformed, with the play-offs being expanded from four to eight teams.

Dynamo Volgograd won its third championship in a row, beating Rostov-Don in the final. Dynamo qualified for the Champions league, while Rostov-Don qualified for the competition's qualifying stage, Lada Togliatti and HC Astrakhanochka for the EHF Cup, and Zvezda Zvenigorod for the Cup Winners' Cup. Universitet Izhevsk lost the relegation play-off, but was spared from relegation as Kirovchanka Saint Petersburg retired following the end of the season.

First stage

Second stage

Championship play-offs

Quarter-finals

5th to 8th positions

1st Stage

2nd Stage

Semifinals

Third Place

Final

Final Table

References

2010 in handball
2011 in handball